Japanese Olympics may refer to:

 Japan at the Olympics
 1940 Summer Olympics, awarded to Tokyo, moved to Helsinki first, then cancelled due to World War II
 1964 Summer Olympics, held in Tokyo, Japan
 1972 Winter Olympics, held in Sapporo, Japan
 1998 Winter Olympics, held in Nagano, Japan
 Tokyo bid for the 2016 Summer Olympics
 2020 Summer Olympics, held in Tokyo, Japan